Milbank, Brinckerhoff, and Fiske Halls are historic buildings located on the campus of Barnard College in Morningside Heights, Manhattan, New York City. The three interconnected buildings are collectively known as Milbank Hall. They were designed by Charles A. Rich (1854–1943), built between 1897 and 1898, and contain classrooms, laboratories, administrative offices and dormitory. They are four stories on a raised basement built of dark red brick with white limestone and terra cotta details. They combine Italian Renaissance massing and detail with Colonial Revival inspired features. The roof of Milbank Hall houses the Arthur Ross Greenhouse.

They were listed on the National Register of Historic Places in 2003.

See also
Barnard Hall
Brooks and Hewitt Halls

References

School buildings on the National Register of Historic Places in Manhattan
Colonial Revival architecture in New York (state)
Renaissance Revival architecture in New York City
School buildings completed in 1898
Buildings and structures in Manhattan
Morningside Heights, Manhattan
1898 establishments in New York (state)
Barnard College